Piúma is a municipality located in the Brazilian state of Espírito Santo. Its population was 22,053 (2020) and its area is 74 km², which makes it the smallest municipality of Espírito Santo. Much of the local population make a living from fishing, handicrafts and the cultivation of shellfish, activities benefited from the natural wealth located along the coast. The city is also famous for receiving thousands of tourists during the week of Carnival.

References

Populated coastal places in Espírito Santo
Municipalities in Espírito Santo